The Center Brook converges with the Unadilla River in New Berlin, New York. The Center Brook has one main tributary, the Shawler Brook which converges with Center Brook in New Berlin, New York.
The Center Brook is part of the Unadilla River watershed.

References

Rivers of New York (state)
Rivers of Chenango County, New York